Pehr von Ehrenheim (1823–1918) was a Swedish politician and the fourth Speaker of Första kammaren of the Riksdag.

References

1823 births
1918 deaths
Speakers of Första kammaren
Members of the Första kammaren
19th-century Swedish politicians
Members of the Royal Society of Sciences in Uppsala